780 Armenia is a minor planet in the asteroid belt orbiting the Sun. It is named after the Kingdom of Armenia, now Armenia. The orbital plane is inclined at an angle of 19.1° to the plane of rotation. This asteroid spans a girth of ~94 km. The long rotation period of this asteroid necessitated light curve data from more than one latitude.

This object is the namesake of the Armenia family, a family of 13–76 asteroids that share similar spectral properties and orbital elements; hence they may have arisen from the same collisional event. All members have a relatively high orbital inclination.

References

External links 
 Discovery Circumstances: Numbered Minor Planets
 
 

000780
Discoveries by Grigory Neujmin
Named minor planets
19140125